Gruet Winery is a New Mexico winery and family business founded in 1984. It specializes in Methode Champenoise sparkling wines using Pinot Noir and Chardonnay grapes, and also produces some still wine.
It traces its history to Gilbert Gruet's Champagne house in Bethon, France.
Natalie and Laurent Gruet planted an experimental vineyard in 1983, and the next year settled on land in Engle, New Mexico about 10 miles from  Truth or Consequences. 
Sofian Himeur, the grandson of Gilbert Gruet,  is now the assistant winemaker.

Gruet has been called “America’s best sparkling wine.”

Wine criticism
Wine Spectator rated its non-vintage brut sparkling wine at 90 points.

References

New Mexico wine
Sparkling wines